Onitsha South is a Local Government Area in South Central Senatorial zone of Anambra State, Nigeria. Fegge is the only town in Onitsha South LGA. Onitsha South is predominantly a commercial city with popular markets such as Ochanja market which attracts thousands of buyers and sellers of variety of commodities. The revenue of Onitsha South Local Government Area is generated mostly from commercial activities.

Schools
Here is the list of secondary schools in Onitsha South Local Government Area:
Christ The King College, (C.K.C.), Onitsha
Learning Field International School, Bridge-Head Housing Estate, Onitsha
 Modebe Memorial Secondary School, Onitsha
 Metu Memorial Secondary School, Onitsha
 Urban Girls’ Secondary School, Onitsha
 Urban Boys’ Secondary School, Onitsha
 Special Secondary School, Odoakpu, Onitsha (Deaf And Dumb)
 Our Lady's High School, Onitsha

References

 cmxgxv bnndgbkkbcdnlzscbboa.gov.ng/cities.htm LOCAL GOVERNMENT AREAS IN ANAMBRA STATE dated July 21, 2007; accessed October 4, 2007

Local Government Areas in Anambra State
Local Government Areas in Igboland